Beaver Dam Township is one of ten townships in Butler County, Missouri, USA.  As of the 2010 census, its population was 4,473.

Geography
It contains nine cemeteries: Bay Springs, Cochran, Dickens, Dunning, Hudgens, Kinsey, Lone Hill, Military and Montgomery.

The streams of Beaverdam Creek, Case Bolt Branch, Dolly Branch, Fletcher Branch, Haw Branch, Kenner Spring Branch and Wolf Creek run through this township.

References

External links
 US-Counties.com
 City-Data.com

Townships in Butler County, Missouri
Townships in Missouri